Madrepora cristata is an unaccepted scientific name and may refer to two species of corals:
 Lobophyllia hemprichii as described by Esper, 1789
 Pavona cactus as described by Ellis & Solander